Sogatella kolophon is a species of delphacid planthopper in the family Delphacidae. It is found in Africa, Australia, the Caribbean, Central America, North America, Oceania, South America, and Southern Asia.

Subspecies
Three subspecies belong to the species Sogatella kolophon:
 Sogatella kolophon atlantica Fennah, 1963 c g
 Sogatella kolophon kolophon g
 Sogatella kolophon meridiana (Beamer, 1952) c g
Data sources: i = ITIS, c = Catalogue of Life, g = GBIF, b = Bugguide.net

References

Further reading

External links

 

Articles created by Qbugbot
Insects described in 1907
Delphacini
Insect pests of millets